The 1973 French Open was a tennis tournament that took place on the outdoor clay courts at the Stade Roland Garros in Paris, France. The tournament ran from  21 May until 3 June. It was the 77th staging of the French Open, and the second Grand Slam tennis event of 1973. Ilie Năstase and Margaret Court won the singles titles.

Finals

Men's singles

 Ilie Năstase defeated  Nikola Pilić, 6–3, 6–3, 6–0 
• It was Năstase's 2nd and last career Grand Slam singles title and his 1st and only title at the French Open.

Women's singles
 
 Margaret Court defeated  Chris Evert, 6–7, 7–6, 6–4 
• It was Court's 23rd career Grand Slam singles title, her 10th in the Open Era and her 5th and last title at the French Open.

Men's doubles

 John Newcombe /  Tom Okker defeated  Jimmy Connors /  Ilie Năstase, 6–1, 3–6, 6–3, 5–7, 6–4 
• It was Newcombe's 14th career Grand Slam doubles title and his 3rd and last title at the French Open.
• It was Okker's 1st career Grand Slam doubles title and his 1st and only title at the French Open.

Women's doubles

 Margaret Court /  Virginia Wade defeated  Françoise Dürr /  Betty Stöve, 6–2, 6–3 
• It was Court's 17th career Grand Slam doubles title, her 8th during the Open Era and her 4th and last title at the French Open.
• It was Wade's 2nd career Grand Slam doubles title and her 1st and only title at the French Open.

Mixed doubles

 Françoise Dürr /  Jean-Claude Barclay defeated  Betty Stöve /  Patrice Dominguez, 6–1, 6–4 
• It was Dürr's 3rd career Grand Slam mixed doubles title and her 3rd and last title at the French Open.
• It was Barclay's 3rd and last career Grand Slam mixed doubles title and his 3rd title at the French Open.

Prize money

Total prize money for the event was FF600,100.

Notes

References

External links
 French Open official website

 
1973 Grand Prix (tennis)
1973 in French tennis
1973 in Paris